Habra railway station (Bengali: হাবড়া রেলওয়ে স্টেশন), station code HB, is a station of Eastern Railway. It serves Habra town and is a part of the Kolkata Suburban Railway system.

Station complex 
The station consists of three platforms and are very much well sheltered. It has many facilities including drinking water and sanitation. Here, both two types of railway tickets - reserved and unreserved are available.

Electrification 
The Sealah–Dum Dum–Barasat–Ashok Nagar–Bangaon line was electrified in 1963–64.

Connectivity 
Habra railway station connects Gobardanga, Thakurnagar and Bangaon to Sealdah station and other stations of the Sealdah–Bangaon line. It is directly connected to NH 112 (Jessore Road). Habra is a major railway station between Bangaon junction railway station and Barasat junction railway station.

History 
Habra is located on Sealdah–Hasnabad–Bangaon–Ranaghat line of Kolkata Suburban Railway. It links between Dum Dum to Khulna now in Bangladesh, via Bangaon was constructed by Bengal Central Railway Company in 1882–84.

The station layout

See also

References

External links 

 Habra Station Map

Sealdah railway division
Railway stations in North 24 Parganas district
Kolkata Suburban Railway stations